Eslamabad (also Romanized as Eslāmābād) is a village in Gowdin Rural District, in the Central District of Kangavar County, Kermanshah Province, Iran. At the 2006 census, its population was 213, in 57 families.

References 

Populated places in Kangavar County